Leslie Howard Kelley (born December 9, 1944) is a former American football fullback/linebacker in the National Football League for the New Orleans Saints. He played college football at Alabama and played just 3 seasons in the NFL without ever starting.

He was the first ever draft choice of the Saints, taken with the final pick of the first round in the 1967 draft. The Saints originally had the #1 overall pick in that draft, but traded it to the Baltimore Colts for quarterback Gary Cuozzo. The Colts selected Michigan State All-America defensive end Bubba Smith with the traded pick.

External links
 databasefootball.com
 :de:Hollywood Sign

1944 births
Living people
Sportspeople from Decatur, Alabama
Players of American football from Alabama
American football linebackers
American football fullbacks
Alabama Crimson Tide football players
New Orleans Saints players